Roughnecks is a British television drama series, created and principally written by former Tomorrow's World presenter Kieran Prendiville, that first broadcast on BBC1 on 16 June 1994. Produced by First Choice Productions, Roughnecks ran for two series, with the final episode broadcasting on 21 December 1995. The series centres on the working and personal lives of the crew of the fictional oil rig "The Osprey Explorer" in the North Sea. Offshore filming was undertaken on the oil rig Dan Countess, which was not in use at the time.

The series boasted a high calibre cast, including the likes of Liam Cunningham, Teresa Banham, James Cosmo, Bruce Jones, Clive Russell, Ricky Tomlinson, Paul Copley and Ashley Jensen. Notably for a British television series, the main theme was written and composed by renowned American television composer Mike Post. An official guide to the series, written by Tom McGregor and featuring interviews with the cast and crew, was published on 29 September 1995, prior to the broadcast of the second series. Neither series has been made available on DVD.

Cast
Cast listed as per order of credits in the opening title sequence
 Liam Cunningham as Chris Brennan
 George Rossi as Kevin Lamb
 Francesca Hunt as Hilary Whiteson
 Bruce Jones as Terry Morrell
 John McGlynn as Drew MacAllister
 James Cosmo as Tom Butcher
 Ashley Jensen as Heather Butcher (née Brennan)
 Clive Russell as Archie McGrandle
 Alec Westwood as Davey Rains
 Teresa Banham as Tessa Buckingham
 Ricky Tomlinson as Douglas "Cinders" Hudson
 Paul Copley as Ian Pollard
 Anne Raitt as Izzy Butcher
 Colum Convey as Graeme "Ceefax" Revell
 Hywel Simons as Wilf "Village" Granelle
 Katy Murphy as Cath (Series 2)
 Martin Wenner as Edvard Bergman (Series 2)
 John Kazek as Telegram Sam (Series 1)
 Bruce Jamieson as Burgess (series 1)

Episodes

Series 1 (1994)

Series 2 (1995)

References

External links

BBC television dramas
1994 British television series debuts
1995 British television series endings
1990s British drama television series
Television shows set in Scotland
English-language television shows